The Attainder of the Earl of Kildare Act 1536 (28 Hen.8 c.18) was a bill of attainder passed by the Parliament of England to authorise the execution of the 
10th Earl of Kildare, his uncles and Archdeacon Charles Reynolds, for treason.

See also
High treason in the United Kingdom

References

Treason in England
Acts of the Parliament of England (1485–1603)
1536 in law
1536 in England
Capital punishment in the United Kingdom